Jack Paterson (28 May 1911 – 27 October 1994) was an  Australian rules footballer who played with South Melbourne and North Melbourne in the Victorian Football League (VFL).

Paterson went to Williamstown in 1936 after 31 games and 27 goals with North Melbourne from 1932 and 1934-35 and 14 games and 14 goals with South Melbourne in 1931. He would go on to play 77 games and kick 109 goals for 'Town up until the end of 1940, including the 1939 premiership where he was first rover and runner-up in the best and fairest award that year. He was leading goalkicker in 1938 with 31 majors, best clubman in 1937 and most consistent player in 1936. Paterson died on 27 October 1994, aged 83.

Notes

External links 

1911 births
1994 deaths
Australian rules footballers from Victoria (Australia)
Sydney Swans players
North Melbourne Football Club players